Celles is a commune in the Hérault department in southern France.

History

The village sits on the bank of Lac du Salagou. When the dam that created the lake was built (1964–68), the intention was to raise the water level in two stages—first to 139m, then to 150m. The second stage would have engulfed the village of Celles, which is at a mean altitude of 144m, and accordingly the village and its vineyards were officially abandoned. The first stage of water level left the water lapping at the foot of the village without encroaching on any structures. The second stage was never implemented, so a few villagers re-occupied the Mairie, repairing public buildings in order that the status of Celles as a commune would be preserved. However, the French authorities are allowing the village to decay and all buildings except the Mairie and the church are in ruins. It is a popular place for fishing and picnics.

In 1990, the city council, hoping to "move" the department to revitalize the village, called on the general council, owner of the ruins, to secure them in the name of public safety. The expected result - the restoration of the houses - actually led to a crystallization action of the village, with a concreting of the ridges and laying fences around the houses. It was not until 1996 that the department took the official decision to permanently maintain the rating 139. From the beginning, some of the former inhabitants fought to maintain the status of commune in Celles, and regularly maintained and renovated communal buildings, not expropriable

The ruined village has served as a backdrop for several feature film scenes, notably the 1985 thriller Zone Rouge (Red Zone).

Possible repopulation
In September 2017 a scheme was announced for the repopulation of Celles. The village will be partially rebuilt, connected to the water and telephone systems, and 119 people will move in in time for the 50th anniversary of the abandonment, September 2019.

Population

Politics and administration

See also
Communes of the Hérault department

Further reading
Sam Harrison. "How to Make Sense of an Undrowned Town."  Atlas Obscura, January 20, 2020.

References

Communes of Hérault